Croatia participated in the Eurovision Song Contest 2004 with the song "You Are the Only One" written by Ivan Mikulić, Vedran Ostojić and Duško Gruborović. The song was performed by Ivan Mikulić. The Croatian broadcaster Croatian Radiotelevision (HRT) organised the national final Dora 2004 to select the Croatian entry for the 2004 contest in Istanbul, Turkey. Twenty-four entries competed in the national final which consisted of three shows: two semi-finals and a final. Six entries qualified from each semi-final on 12 and 13 March 2004 to compete in the final on 14 March 2004. In the final, "Daješ mi krila" performed by Ivan Mikulić was selected as the winner following a regional televote. The song was later translated from Croatian to English for the Eurovision Song Contest and was titled "You Are the Only One".

Croatia competed in the semi-final of the Eurovision Song Contest which took place on 12 May 2004. Performing during the show in position 18, "You Are the Only One" was announced among the top 10 entries of the semi-final and therefore qualified to compete in the final on 15 May. It was later revealed that Croatia placed ninth out of the 22 participating countries in the semi-final with 72 points. In the final, Croatia performed in position 11 and placed twelfth out of the 24 participating countries, scoring 50 points.

Background 

The nation's best result in the contest was fourth, which it achieved on two occasions: in 1996 with the song "Sveta ljubav" performed by Maja Blagdan and in 1999 with the song "Marija Magdalena" performed by Doris Dragović. In 2003, Croatia placed fifteenth with Claudia Beni and the song "Više nisam tvoja".

The Croatian national broadcaster, Croatian Radiotelevision (HRT), broadcasts the event within Croatia and organises the selection process for the nation's entry. Since 1993, HRT organised the national final Dora in order to select the Croatian entry for the Eurovision Song Contest, a method that was continued for their 2004 participation.

Before Eurovision

Dora 2004 
Dora 2004 was the twelfth edition of the Croatian national selection Dora which selected Croatia's entry for the Eurovision Song Contest 2004. The competition consisted of two semi-finals on 12 and 13 March 2004 and a final on 14 March 2004, all taking place at the Hotel Kvarner in Opatija and broadcast on HTV1 as well as online via the broadcaster's website hrt.hr.

Format 
Twenty-four songs competed in Dora 2004 which consisted of three shows: two semi-finals and a final. Twelve songs competed in each semi-final with the top six proceeding to complete the twelve-song lineup in the final. The results of all shows were determined solely by public televoting. Public voting included options for telephone and SMS voting, and the votes were divided into six telephone regions in Croatia. Each region created an overall ranking from which points from 1 (lowest) to 12 (highest) were assigned to the competing songs. Ties in all shows were decided in favour of the entry that received the higher number of high-scoring points.

Competing entries 
On 3 December 2003, HRT opened a submission period where artists and composers were able to submit their entries to the broadcaster with the deadline on 17 January 2004. 297 entries were received by the broadcaster during the submission period. A seven-member expert committee consisting of representatives of HRT: Željko Mesar, Aleksandar Kostadinov, Željen Klašterka, Tomislav Štengl, Zoran Brajša, Marin Margetić and Dubravko Češnjak reviewed the received submissions and selected twenty-four artists and songs for the competition. HRT announced the competing entries on 24 January 2004.

Shows

Semi-finals 
The two semi-finals took place on 12 and 13 March 2004, hosted by Duško Ćurlić who was joined by Tihana Zrnić in the first semi-final and Barbara Radulović in the second semi-final. The six qualifiers for the final from each semi-final were determined by a regional televote. In addition to the performances of the competing entries, 2004 Ukrainian Eurovision entrant Ruslana performed as the interval act during the first semi-final.

Final
The final took place on 14 March 2004, hosted by Duško Ćurlić, Tihana Zrnić and Barbara Radulović. The winner, "Daješ mi krila" performed by Ivan Mikulić, was determined by a regional televote. In addition to the performances of the competing entries, Maksim Mrvica, Ana Rucner, Laura Vadjon, Lana Kos and 2003 Croatian Eurovision entrant Claudia Beni performed as the interval acts during the show.

At Eurovision 
It was announced that the competition's format would be expanded to include a semi-final in 2004. According to the rules, all nations with the exceptions of the host country, the "Big Four" (France, Germany, Spain and the United Kingdom), and the ten highest placed finishers in the 2003 contest are required to qualify from the semi-final on 12 May 2004 in order to compete for the final on 15 May 2004; the top ten countries from the semi-final progress to the final. On 23 March 2004, a special allocation draw was held which determined the running order for the semi-final and Croatia was set to perform in position 19, following the entry from Estonia and before the entry from Denmark. Ivan Mikulić performed the English version of "Daješ mi krila" at the contest, titled "You Are the Only One" (formerly "You Were My Only Love"). At the end of the semi-final, Croatia was announced as having finished in the top 10 and consequently qualifying for the grand final. It was later revealed that Croatia placed ninth in the semi-final, receiving a total of 72 points. The draw for the running order for the final was done by the presenters during the announcement of the ten qualifying countries during the semi-final and Croatia was drawn to perform in position 11, following the entry from Ukraine and before the entry from Bosnia and Herzegovina. Croatia placed twelfth in the final, scoring 50 points.

Both the semi-final and the final were broadcast in Croatia on HRT with commentary by Aleksandar Kostadinov. The Croatian spokesperson, who announced the Croatian votes during the final, was Barbara Kolar.

Voting 
Below is a breakdown of points awarded to Croatia and awarded by Croatia in the semi-final and grand final of the contest. The nation awarded its 12 points to Serbia and Montenegro in the semi-final and the final of the contest.

Points awarded to Croatia

Points awarded by Croatia

References

2004
Countries in the Eurovision Song Contest 2004
Eurovision